Ogami Lighthouse is a lighthouse located on Ogami Island off the coast of Nagasaki Prefecture in southern Japan. It is notably the first photovoltaically powered lighthouse in the world and was instrumental in demonstrating the viability of photovoltaics in 1966.

See also

 List of lighthouses in Japan

References

External links
Picture of Ogami Lighthouse

Lighthouses completed in 1966
Lighthouses in Japan
Solar power in Japan